Marple Bridge is a district of Marple in the Metropolitan Borough of Stockport, Greater Manchester, England, on the River Goyt, which runs through the centre of the village.

Historically part of the civil parish of Glossop, Derbyshire, it was included in the new parish of Ludworth and Chisworth in 1866.  Ludworth became a separate parish in 1896 and was abolished in 1936, when the former parish was transferred to Cheshire and amalgamated into Marple Urban District. In 1974, the urban district was abolished and Marple Bridge became part of the Metropolitan Borough of Stockport in the county of Greater Manchester. It shares borders with Mellor, Marple, Compstall, New Mills, Strines, Mill Brow and Chisworth.  It is in the ecclesiastical parish of Mellor; the parish church of St. Thomas stands several hundred feet higher than the village, overlooking Greater Manchester and Cheshire.

Transport
The village is served by Marple station on the Hope Valley line between Manchester Piccadilly and Sheffield. There are two services generally per hour each way; eastbound, services alternate between New Mills Central and Sheffield.  

The village has several bus services running through it. The most regular services run on a Stockport circular route to Romiley and Bredbury (383 anticlockwise) and to Marple and Offerton (384 clockwise). There is also an hourly 394 service to Glossop in Derbyshire and Stepping Hill Hospital in the other direction. It also has bus services to Hayfield and New Mills in Derbyshire.

Conservation Area
Marple Bridge village centre has been designated a Conservation Area. The Conservation Area was originally established in 1974 and was extended in 2006 to incorporate Brabyns Park.

Stockport Metropolitan Borough Council has produced a Conservation Area Character Appraisal document, outlining the reasons that the Conservation Area has been designated as such. In justifying the reasons for designation, this document states of the town: 
“Marple Bridge is a predominantly stone-built village situated on the banks of the River Goyt, just to the north east of Marple... Historically the location had significance as a bridging point on the route between Stockport and Derbyshire and where water power was available initially for a forge and corn mill. Marple Bridge developed from the 18th century as a small urban centre. Of special importance is the landscape setting of Marple Bridge formed by the steep-sided valley of the [River] Goyt...”

The bridge itself was built in the 19th century but widened in the 19230s. It is a Grade II listed building.

Education
Marple Bridge has two schools: Ludworth Primary School and St Mary's Catholic Voluntary Academy.

Notable people

 Pete Mitchell, radio presenter, lived in Marple Bridge
 Roddy Frame, Scottish musician and lead singer of Aztec Camera, lived in a wooden shack in Marple Bridge, between 1984 and 1987.
 Band Delphic are residents of Marple Bridge
 Andy Votel, musician and DJ, grew up in Marple Bridge

See also

Listed buildings in Marple, Greater Manchester

References

External links

Community
 Marple Bridge Association
 Marple Bridge page at Stockport Council site
 St Thomas' Church, Mellor and Marple Bridge
 St. Mary's Parish Website

Villages in Greater Manchester
Towns and villages of the Peak District
Geography of the Metropolitan Borough of Stockport
Marple, Greater Manchester